Carytown is the name of two places in the United States of America:
Carytown, Missouri, a village in Jasper County
Carytown, Richmond, Virginia, a shopping district and neighborhood near Richmond's Museum District